The 1934 Boston University Terriers football team was an American football team that represented Boston University as an independent during the 1934 college football season. In its first season under head coach Pat Hanley, the team compiled a 3–4 record and was outscored by a total of 104 to 40.

Schedule

References

Boston University
Boston University Terriers football seasons
Boston University football